Grady Benton (born February 20, 1973) is a former American football quarterback who played one season in the Arena Football League with the Memphis Pharaohs and Texas Terror. He first enrolled at Arizona State University before transferring to West Texas A&M University. He was the offensive coordinator at Randall High School in Amarillo, Texas from 2000 to 2006. He was the head football coach at Slaton High School in Slaton, Texas from 2007 to 2011, accumulating a record of 14–36. He was the head football coach at Haskell High School in Haskell, Texas from 2012 to 2016, accumulating a record of 21–30.

References

External links
Just Sports Stats

Living people
1973 births
American football quarterbacks
Arizona State Sun Devils football players
West Texas A&M Buffaloes football players
Memphis Pharaohs players
Players of American football from Arizona
Texas Terror players
High school football coaches in Texas